Yuzana (born Yuzana Myint Ngwe) is a Burmese pop singer. Yuzana first entered the music industry with the band 102.7. Her parents are songwriter Myint Ngwe (Hinthada) and singer Tin Tin Aye. In February 2008, she married an Australian national, Thein Htaik Aung. Her brother Phyo Gyi is also a Burmese singer.

References

21st-century Burmese women singers
Living people
Year of birth missing (living people)